Kinglake may refer to 
Kinglake (surname)
Kinglake, Ontario, a community in Canada
Kinglake, Victoria, a town in Australia
ABC Kinglake Ranges, a temporary radio service broadcasting from Kinglake, Victoria
Kinglake Football Club from Kinglake, Victoria
Kinglake West, Victoria, a town in Australia
Kinglake National Park in Central Victoria, Australia